Dragana is a Slavic given name for females. It is the feminine form of the male name Dragan, which comes from the Slavic element dorogo/drago, which means "precious".

Notable women named Dragana include:

Dragana Cvijić (born 1990), Serbian handball player
Dragana Jugović del Monaco, Serbian mezzo-soprano
Dragana Kovačević (born 1981), Serbian cyclist
Dragana Kršenković Brković (born c. 1950), Montenegrin writer
Dragana Marinković (born 1982), Croatian and Serbian volleyball player
Dragana Mirković (born 1968), Serbian singer
Dragana Pecevska (born 1983), Macedonian handball player
Dragana Stanković (born 1995), Serbian basketball player
Dragana Šarić (born 1962), Serbian singer better known as "Bebi Dol"
Dragana Tomašević (born 1982), Serbian discus thrower
Dragana Zarić (born 1977), Serbian tennis player

References

Slavic feminine given names